Louder Than War is a DVD release from the Welsh rock band Manic Street Preachers. It is a recording of their live concert in the Karl Marx Theatre in Havana, Cuba, in 2001.

The concert was notable for being the first time a western rock band had played in Cuba. Fidel Castro was in attendance, and met the band before the concert. The DVD's title came from a conversation between the band and Castro – after the band warned him that the concert would be very loud, Castro responded (through his translator) "It cannot be louder than war, can it?"

The concert was also notable for featuring performances of several songs taken from the band's then-latest album Know Your Enemy, some of which have not been performed since.

The bonus live tracks are songs taken from the same concert, but taken away from the main track listing and shown in inferior sound and video quality.

Track listing
'Found That Soul'
'Motorcycle Emptiness'
'Kevin Carter'
'Ocean Spray'
'If You Tolerate This Your Children Will Be Next'
'Let Robeson Sing'
'The Year of Purification'
'Baby Elián'
'Miss Europa Disco Dancer'
'Wattsville Blues'
'You Love Us'
'Motown Junk'
'Australia'
'Rock and Roll Music'

Bonus live tracks
'So Why So Sad'
'A Design for Life'
'The Masses Against the Classes'
'You Stole the Sun from My Heart'
'Raindrops Keep Falling on My Head'
'Freedom of Speech Won't Feed My Children'

Extras
Cuba documentary
Tour diary
Exclusive interviews
Photo gallery
Discography
Hidden easter egg video clips

External links 

 Drowned in Sound review of the DVD
 NME article mentioning the concert
 Telegraph article mentioning the concert
 Mirror article mentioning the concert

Manic Street Preachers video albums
Manic Street Preachers live albums
2001 video albums